Ramderiya is a village of Barmer district in Sheo Tehsil from Rajasthan.

References

Villages in Barmer district